Andrei Nikolayevich Tsukanov (born 15 April 1977) is a former Russian football player.

External links
 

1977 births
Living people
Russian footballers
FC Torpedo Moscow players
FC Torpedo-2 players
Russian Premier League players
FC Tyumen players
Place of birth missing (living people)
Association football midfielders
FC Sodovik Sterlitamak players